Retraction or retract(ed) may refer to:

Academia
 Retraction in academic publishing, withdrawals of previously published academic journal articles

Mathematics
 Retraction (category theory)
 Retract (group theory)
 Retraction (topology)

Human physiology
 Retracted (phonetics), a sound pronounced to the back of the vocal tract, in linguistics
 Retracted tongue root, a position of the tongue during the pronunciation of a vowel, in phonetics
 Sternal retraction, a symptom of respiratory distress in humans
 Retraction (kinesiology), an anatomical term of motion

See also 
 Retractor (disambiguation)